"No Rain" is a song by American rock band Blind Melon. It was released in 1992 as the second single from the band's debut album Blind Melon. The song is well known for its accompanying music video, which features the "Bee Girl" character. The music video, directed by Samuel Bayer, received heavy airplay on MTV at the time of its release. It subsequently helped propel Blind Melon to a multi-platinum level.

The song is the band's highest-charting song, reaching number 20 on the US Billboard Hot 100 and number one on both the Billboard Album Rock Tracks and Modern Rock Tracks charts. It proved to be successful internationally, peaking at number one in Canada and number eight in Australia.

Background
"No Rain" is in the key of E Mixolydian, and is performed in a moderately fast tempo.

Although the song is credited to the whole band, it was bassist Brad Smith who wrote the greater part of "No Rain". He said: "The song is about not being able to get out of bed and find excuses to face the day when you have really, in a way, nothing." At the time, Smith had been dating a girl who was going through depression (she would sleep through sunny days and complain when it didn't rain), and for a while he told himself that he was writing the song from her perspective, though Smith later realized that he was also writing it about himself.

Music video
The music video, directed by Samuel Bayer, stars Heather DeLoach as the "Bee Girl", a young tap dancer wearing a homemade bee costume and large glasses, modeled after the Blind Melon album cover: a family picture of Georgia Graham, younger sister of drummer Glen Graham. The Bee Girl's story is intercut with footage of Blind Melon performing in a field against a clear blue sky.

It opens on the girl's tap routine; the audience responds with mocking laughter, and the girl runs off-stage in tears. As the song plays, she wanders through Los Angeles, stopping to perform her dance for whoever will watch, but she still feels alone. Ultimately, at the point in the song where the word "escape" is repeated, she peeks through a gate, which elicits a look of astonishment on her face, then runs through it to join a group of "bee people" just like her, dancing joyfully in a green field.

As a result of the video, DeLoach appeared on the 1993 MTV Video Music Awards doing her "Bee Girl" dance to close the show, and also appeared as the "Bee Girl" in the video for "Weird Al" Yankovic's song "Bedrock Anthem".

Reception
Pitchfork described the song as "a playfully jingle-jangle riff that feels strummed from a hammock, a beguiling falsetto vocal from wildly charismatic frontman Shannon Hoon, a sweet and mournful lyric about watching the world go by that doesn't sound depressed even though it literally describes depression."

Track listings

US maxi-CD single (1992) and Australian CD single (1993)
 "No Rain" (LP version)
 "No Rain" (live)
 "Drive" (live)
 "Soak the Sin" (live)

US cassette single (1992)
 "No Rain" (LP version) – 3:15
 "No Rain" (live) – 6:00
 "Soak the Sin" (live) – 3:50

French maxi-CD single (1992)
 "No Rain (live) – 5:25
 "Candy Says" (Country Jellyfish version) – 3:29
 "Paper Scratcher" (acoustic version) – 3:10
 "Tones of Home" (remix) – 4:29

European CD single (1993)
 "No Rain" (LP version)
 "Paper Scratcher" (Board mix)

UK CD and 12-inch single (1993)
 "No Rain" (LP version)
 "Soak the Sin" (Board mix)
 "Paper Scratcher" (Board mix)
 "Deserted" (Board mix)

UK 7-inch and cassette single (1993)
 "No Rain" (LP version) – 3:15
 "No Bidness" (Triple Vision version)
 "I Wonder" (LP version)
 "No Bidiness" was recorded live at Bogarts, Cincinnati, Ohio, on August 11, 1993

Charts

Weekly charts

Year-end charts

Certifications

Release history

See also
 List of RPM number-one singles of 1993
 List of Billboard Mainstream Rock number-one songs of the 1990s
 Number one modern rock hits of 1993

References

External links
 

1992 songs
1993 singles
Blind Melon songs
RPM Top Singles number-one singles
Song recordings produced by Rick Parashar

pt:No Rain